Newtonburg is an unincorporated community in Clearfield County, Pennsylvania, United States.

Notes

Unincorporated communities in Clearfield County, Pennsylvania
Unincorporated communities in Pennsylvania